Cumberland Regional Health Care Centre is a hospital near Amherst, Nova Scotia, Canada. Located next to Highway 104 in the rural community of Upper Nappan, Cumberland Regional serves residents of Cumberland County.

History
A charitable organisation, the Highland View Regional Hospital Foundation, was established in 1993 to raise funds toward a replacement for the old Highland View Regional Hospital in Amherst.

In October 1997, Nova Scotia premier Russell MacLellan and health minister Jim Smith formally announced that the hospital would be replaced, with the province covering 75 per cent of the construction cost of a new facility. 

The building is organised around a two-storey main corridor designed to allow natural light into the hospital interior. It opened in October 2002.

Initially operated by the Cumberland Health Authority, management of the hospital was transferred to the new Nova Scotia Health Authority after Nova Scotia's regional health authorities were dissolved in 2015.

The hospital made national headlines in January 2023 following the death of a 37-year-old woman, Allison Holthoff, after she waited around seven hours for treatment in the emergency department. The death has been viewed as emblematic of worsening crisis in Nova Scotia's healthcare system.

Facilities
Cumberland Regional has a 24-hour emergency department.

References

External links
 

2002 establishments in Nova Scotia
Buildings and structures in Cumberland County, Nova Scotia
Heliports in Canada
Hospital buildings completed in 2002
Hospitals established in 2002
Hospitals in Nova Scotia